The Taipei Economic and Cultural Office in Thailand (S̄ảnạkngān ṣ̄ers̄ʹṭ̄hkic Læa Wạtʹhnṭhrrm Thịpe Pracả Pratheṣ̄thịy) is the representative office of Taiwan in Thailand, which functions as a de facto embassy in the absence of diplomatic relations.

The Office has joint responsibility for Bangladesh with the Taipei Economic and Cultural Center in India in New Delhi. Between 2004 and 2009, affairs with Bangladesh were handled by the Taipei Economic and Cultural Office in Bangladesh in Dhaka.

Its counterpart body in Taiwan is the Thailand Trade and Economic Office in Taipei.

History
Until 1975, Taiwan, as the Republic of China, had an embassy in Bangkok, but this was closed after Thailand established full diplomatic relations with the People's Republic of China, leading to its replacement in September of that year by the Office of the Representative of China Airlines in Thailand.

It was renamed the Far East Trade Office in 1980. The office was upgraded in 1991, and renamed the Taipei Economic and Trade Center, before being renamed again as the Taipei Economic and Trade Office in 1992. It adopted its present name in 1999.

Representatives
 Kelly Hsieh (2015–2017)
 Tung Chen-yuan (2017–2020)
Lee Ying-yuan (2020–2021)

See also
List of diplomatic missions of Taiwan
Taipei Economic and Cultural Representative Office

References

Taiwan
1975 establishments in Thailand
Thailand
Organizations established in 1975
Foreign trade of Thailand
Taiwan–Thailand relations